Willaq Pirqa is a 2022 Peruvian-Bolivian Quechua-language comedy-drama film directed by César Galindo and written by Galindo, Augusto Cabada and Gastón Vizcarra. It tells the story of Sistu, a 13-year-old boy who lives in a community in Cusco, he discovers the magic of cinema, but the language barrier prevents the villagers from enjoying the movies.

Synopsis 
Sistu and his small community in the Andes discover the magic of cinema. This meeting causes a stir but also confronts them with their culture and highlights the limitations of the community to understand and read Spanish. As a solution, they choose Sistu so that every week he goes to town to see a movie and tells it to everyone in the square. One day he finds the canchón empty, the cinema has left... Sistu's illusion of telling the weekly story to the people who are waiting for him, makes him create his own cinema, with his own actors, with his own culture and above all, in your own language.

Cast 
The actors participating in this film are:

 Víctor Acuario as Sistu
 Hermelinda Luján as Mom Simona
 Melisa Álvarez as Lucicha
 Alder Yaurisaca as Florencio
 Cosme Flores as Rolín
 Bernando Rosado as Projectionist

Production

Financing and filming 
In 2015, the film was a beneficiary of the Economic Stimulus of the Ministry of Culture, in the competition for fiction feature film projects in native languages. The filming began, and it lasted 5 months in Maras and Moray, Cusco.

Music 
Karin Zielinski composed the original soundtrack for the film. Wind, string and percussion instruments such as the Andean violin were implemented. The musicians Rubén Concha (quenas, zampoñas, legüero bass drum, charango and guitar), Andrés Chimango Lares (Andean violin) and María Elena Pacheco (violin) also participated.

Release 
Willaq Pirqa premiered at the 26th Lima Film Festival in August 2022. It was commercially released on December 8, 2022 in Peruvian theaters.

Reception 
Willaq Pirqa drew 42,000 viewers beginning in its sixth week in theaters and ending that same week with over 50,000 viewers. In its ninth week it drew more than 75,000 viewers.

Awards

References

External links 

 

2022 films
2022 comedy-drama films
Peruvian comedy-drama films
Bolivian comedy films
Bolivian drama films
2020s Peruvian films
Quechua-language films
2020s Spanish-language films
Films set in Peru
Films shot in Peru
Films about films
Films about filmmaking
Films about language
Films set in the 1970s